Moose Mountain was a territorial electoral district for the Legislative Assembly of Northwest Territories, Canada.

The riding was created by royal proclamation in 1884 and abolished in 1888. The riding was abolished during redistribution after the North-West Representation Act passed through the Parliament of Canada.

Members of the Legislative Assembly (MLAs)

Election results

1884 election

1886 election

References

External links 
Website of the Legislative Assembly of Northwest Territories

Former electoral districts of Northwest Territories